The  is a railway line in Yamaguchi Prefecture, Japan, operated by the West Japan Railway Company (JR West). The line connects Ube-Shinkawa Station in Ube and Onoda Station in San'yō-Onoda. The branch from Suzemeda to Motoyama is part of this line.

Stations
All stations are in Yamaguchi Prefecture.

Main Line

Motoyama Branch Line

Rolling stock
 105 series 2-car EMUs
 123 series single-car EMUs

History
The Onoda Light Railway Co. opened the Onoda – Minani-Onoda section in 1915 to service a cement plant.

The Ube Electric Railway Co. opened the Ino – Shin-Okiyama station (since closed) section in 1929, electrified at 600 VDC. The branch to Motoyama opened in 1937, also electrified at 600 VDC.

Both companies were nationalised in 1943, and in 1947 the lines were connected, resulting in the closure of Shin-Okiyama station, the replacement for which was nearby Minami-Onoda station.

In 1950 the Onoda – Minami-Onoda section was electrified and the voltage increased to 1500 VDC on the balance of the line.

CTC signalling was commissioned in 1983, and freight services ceased in 1986.

References

Rail transport in Yamaguchi Prefecture
Lines of West Japan Railway Company
1067 mm gauge railways in Japan
Railway lines opened in 1915